Pete Richardson (born October 17, 1946) is a former American football defensive back in the National Football League and former college head coach.

Richardson played college football at University of Dayton, and was drafted by the Buffalo Bills in the sixth round of the 1968 NFL Draft. He played for the Bills for three years until a knee injury ended his playing career.

Richardson embarked into a steadfast 30 plus year coaching career in the late 1970s, starting out in the high school football ranks in Dayton, Ohio, before moving up to NCAA Division II football in 1979 as he joined the coaching staff at Winston-Salem State University in Winston-Salem, North Carolina. In 1988 Richardson became the head coach of the Winston-Salem State University Rams. He served from 1988 to 1992, where he compiled a win–loss record of 41–14-1, winning three Central Intercollegiate Athletic Association (CIAA) conference championships (1988, 1990, 1991) and led the Rams to two appearances in the Division II football playoffs in 1990 and 1991.

He left the Winston-Salem State Rams football program in good shape, and pursued a higher challenge
he became head football coach on the Division I-AA level at Southern University in Baton Rouge, Louisiana in 1993.
During his tenure the Jaguar football team won five Southwestern Athletic Conference (SWAC) titles, including back-to-back-to-back crowns in 1997, 1998, 1999, and the 2003, as well four Black college football national championships (1993, 1995, 1997, 2003). His teams also made six appearances in the now defunct Heritage Bowl, a post-season HBCU Bowl game. Richardson compiled a win–loss record of 134–62-0 in 17 seasons as Head Coach, making him the second winningest coach in the history of the Southern Jaguars football program behind coach Arnett Mumford. He is the only coach in the history of the Southern University football program to have the unique distinction go undefeated against the well past prime College Football Hall Of Fame coach Eddie Robinson  of Grambling State University Tigers in the Bayou Classic.

Richardson, towards the end of his 30-year college head coach career in the Division II and Division I-AA (now Football Championship Subdivision) ranks has collected a load of accolades specially allocated to football coaches of HBCUs Historically Black Colleges and Universities, such as the Black Coaches Association's Coach of the Year in 1998, five-time SWAC Coach of the Year (1995, 1997, 1998, 1999 and 2003), Atlanta's 100% Wrong Club's Coach of the Year (1995, 1997, 1998, 1999 and 2003), Washington D.C.'s Pigskin Club's Coach of the Year (1995, 1998 and 2003), the Kodak Region IV Coach of the Year (1995) and the Sheridan Broadcasting Network's Coach of the Year (1997 and 2003).

There is a huge number of former Southern Jaguar players that came through during Richardson's tenure, who were All-SWAC Conference players and Black College All-Americans. Only a very few of them have able to move on and establish careers in the National Football League.  They are Jerry Wilson, Ahmad Treaudo, and Lenny Williams.
Wilson, a 4th round NFL Draft pick in 1995, has been the only player from this group that achieved veteran status, playing 10 seasons with three teams. The other players have been practice squad free agents, seeing little to no action. Yancey Thigpen was the only Winston-Salem Ram player under Richardson who went on to the NFL.

Head coaching record

College

References

External links
 

1946 births
Living people
American football defensive backs
American Football League players
Buffalo Bills players
Dayton Flyers football players
Southern Jaguars football coaches
Winston-Salem State Rams football coaches
High school football coaches in Ohio
Coaches of American football from Ohio
Players of American football from Youngstown, Ohio
African-American coaches of American football
African-American players of American football
20th-century African-American sportspeople
21st-century African-American sportspeople